The 1880 Welsh Cup Final, was the third in the competition. It was contested by Druids and Ruthin at the Racecourse Ground, Wrexham.

Route to the Final

Druids

Ruthin

Final

References

Welsh Cup Finals
Welsh Cup Final
Welsh Cup Final 1880